The 2007–08 Turkish Basketball League was the 42nd season of the top professional basketball league in Turkey. Beşiktaş Cola Turka finished first in the regular season and Fenerbahçe Ülker won their third national championship at the end of playoffs.

Regular season standings 
Last updated May 10, 2008

Alpella and TTNet Beykoz were relegated to Turkish Second Basketball League. Erdemirspor and Aliağa Belediyespor will play in Turkish Basketball League in 2008–2009 season.

Turkish Basketball League 2007/2008 play-offs 

Turkish Basketball League play-offs started on Saturday, May 3, 2008 and ran through June 4, 2008 with the League finals.

Quarterfinal and Semifinal series are 5-match series. The teams first to reach 3 wins goes through to the next round. The team which has won both regular season match-ups starts with a 1–0 lead to the series.

Final series are 7-match series and the team that is first to reach 4 wins is the champion of the Turkish Basketball League.

2007–08 play-off seedings, results and schedules

Quarter finals 
(1) Beşiktaş Cola Turka (24–6) vs. (8) Bandırma Banvit (14–16) (Series starts 1–0)
 Game 1 3 May @ Beşiktaş Arena, İstanbul: Beşiktaş Cola Turka: 85, Bandırma Banvit: 81 (2–0)
 Game 2 8 May @ Kara Ali Acar, Balıkesir: Bandırma Banvit: 90, Beşiktaş Cola Turka: 89 (1–2)
 Game 3 10 May @ Kara Ali Acar, Balıkesir: Bandırma Banvit: 96, Beşiktaş Cola Turka: 102 (1–3)
Beşiktaş Cola Turka wins the series 3:1

(2) Efes Pilsen (22–8) vs. (7) Pınar Karşıyaka (17–13) (Series starts 0–0)
 Game 1 4 May @ Abdi İpekçi, İstanbul: Efes Pilsen: 73, Pınar Karşıyaka: 79 (0–1)
 Game 2 6 May @ Abdi İpekçi, İstanbul: Efes Pilsen: 78, Pınar Karşıyaka: 56 (1–1)
 Game 3 10 May @ KY Pınar Arena, İzmir: Pınar Karşıyaka: 82, Efes Pilsen: 95 (1–2)
 Game 4 12 May @ KY Pınar Arena, İzmir: Pınar Karşıyaka: 77, Efes Pilsen: 85 (1–3)
Efes Pilsen wins the series 3:1

(3) Fenerbahçe Ülker (21–9) vs. (6) Antalya Belediye (18–12) (Series starts 0–0)
 Game 1 4 May @ Abdi İpekçi, İstanbul: Fenerbahçe Ülker: 78, Antalya Belediye: 73  (1–0)
 Game 2 6 May @ Abdi İpekçi, İstanbul: Fenerbahçe Ülker: 81, Antalya Belediye: 76 (2–0)
 Game 3 10 May @ Atatürk SH, Antalya: Antalya Belediye: 88, Fenerbahçe Ülker: 82 (1–2)
 Game 4 12 May @ Atatürk SH, Antalya: Antalya Belediye: 78, Fenerbahçe Ülker: 85 (1–3)
Fenerbahçe Ülker wins the series 3:1

(4) Türk Telekom (20–10) vs. (5) Galatasaray Café Crown (19–11) (Series starts 0–0)
 Game 1 5 May @ Atatürk Sports Hall, Ankara: Türk Telekom: 78, Galatasaray: 71 (1–0)
 Game 2 7 May @ Atatürk Sports Hall, Ankara: Türk Telekom: 73, Galatasaray: 68 (2–0)
 Game 3 11 May @ Ayhan Şahenk Hall, İstanbul: Galatasaray: 86, Türk Telekom: 88 (0–3)
Türk Telekom wins the series 3:0

Semifinals 
(1) Beşiktaş Cola Turka (24–6) vs. (4) Türk Telekom (20–10) (Series starts 0–1)
 Game 1 16 May @ Beşiktaş Arena, İstanbul: Beşiktaş Cola Turka: 87, Türk Telekom: 77 (1–1)
 Game 2 19 May @ Atatürk Sports H., Ankara: Türk Telekom: 79, Beşiktaş Cola Turka: 74 (2–1)
 Game 3 21 May @ Atatürk Sports H., Ankara: Türk Telekom: 75, Beşiktaş Cola Turka: 71  (3–1)
Türk Telekom wins the series 3:1

(2) Efes Pilsen (22–8) vs. (3) Fenerbahçe Ülker (21–9) (Series starts 0–1)
 Game 1 17 May @ Abdi İpekçi, İstanbul: Efes Pilsen: 65, Fenerbahçe Ülker: 76 (0–2)
 Game 2 20 May @ Abdi İpekçi, İstanbul: Fenerbahçe Ülker: 82, Efes Pilsen: 75 (3–0)
Fenerbahçe Ülker wins the series 3:0

Beko Basketball League Finals 
(3) Fenerbahçe Ülker (21–9) vs. (4) Türk Telekom (20–10) (Series starts 0–0)
 Game 1 25 May @ Abdi İpekçi Arena, İstanbul: Fenerbahçe Ülker: 100, Türk Telekom: 72 (1–0)
 Game 2 27 May @ Abdi İpekçi Arena, İstanbul: Fenerbahçe Ülker: 99, Türk Telekom: 87 (2–0)
 Game 3 30 May @ Atatürk Sports Hall, Ankara: Türk Telekom: 87, Fenerbahçe Ülker: 75 (1–2)
 Game 4 1 June @ Atatürk Sports Hall, Ankara: Türk Telekom: 94, Fenerbahçe Ülker: 96 (OT) (1–3)
 Game 5 4 June @ Abdi İpekçi Arena, İstanbul: Fenerbahçe Ülker: 90, Türk Telekom: 79 (4–1)

Stat leaders

Points per game

Rebounds per game

Assists per game

See also 
 Turkish Basketball League 2008-2009
 Turkish Basketball League 2006-2007

External links 
 Turkish Basketball League Official Website
 Turkish Basketball Federation Official Website
 TBLStat.net League History, 2007-08 Season

References 

Turkish Basketball Super League seasons
Turkish
1